Ningbo–Yuyao intercity railway is a commuter rail service in Ningbo, Zhejiang, part of the planned Ningbo Intercity Railway network. It runs from Ningbo railway station in Haishu District to Yuyao railway station in Yuyao on the existing Xiaoshan–Ningbo railway. There are also through operation to Shaoxing Tourism New Transit railway. Passengers can transfer to Line 2 and Line 4 of Ningbo Metro at Ningbo railway station.

Stations

Services
Eight trains per day run in each direction on the Ningbo–Yuyao Intercity Railway, 4 in the morning and 4 in the afternoon. As of December 2019, trains only serve Ningbo and Yuyao stations, with a travel time of 32 to 38 minutes. In July 2019, 3 train services in each direction started through operation with the Shaoxing Tourism New Transit railway, linking Ningbo and Yuyao with stations in Shaoxing.

Timetable

References

Rail transport in Zhejiang
Railway lines in China
Transport in Ningbo
Yuyao